The DK-10, also known as the Sky Dragon 50, is a surface-to-air missile system developed by Chinese arms manufacturer Norinco. It was designed to be a competitor to the HQ-16 (LY-80), but has not been adopted by the People's Liberation Army for service as the HQ-16 has been preferred. Instead, it has been exported for use by foreign armed forces.

Design
The DK-10 missile was first unveiled at the 2012 Zhuhai Air Show alongside a DK-9C missile as part of the LS-II (Hunter II) Surface To Air Missile system. The LS-II system did not garner any buyers.

In September 2014, the DK-10 missile was displayed again at the AAD Defense Exhibition in South Africa.

In the 2014 Zhuhai Air Show, the DK-10 was displayed as part of the Sky Dragon 50 SAM system. A shorter range version called the Sky Dragon 12 was also displayed.

Description
The DK-10 missile is derived from the SD-10A, an export version of the PL-12 air-to-air missile in service with the PLAAF. The DK-10 missile inherits the active radar seeker of the PL-12 but is physically wider and longer due to the addition of a booster. The maximum range of the SAM is around 50 km and an engagement altitude of between 30 meters and 20 km.

Sky Dragon 50
The Sky Dragon 50 air defense system (SD ADS) is an SAM system based on the DK-10 missile. A typical battery consists of one IBIS 150 3D radar vehicle, one fire distribution vehicle and up to six launch vehicles. Each launch vehicle consists of a 6x6 Beiben Truck Model 2628 carrying 4 ready-to-launch missile canisters.

The IBIS 150 3D radar has a range of over 130 km. The radar can simultaneously track 144 targets and engage 12 targets by guiding a total of 24 missiles, with two missiles against each target to ensure that the minimum probability of kill is greater than eighty percent. Other than the IBIS 150 radar, it can also used intelligence received from superior command & control systems.

In November 2014, the Sky Dragon 50 air defense system was placed on exhibition at the Zhuhai Airshow 2014. It was revealed that the Sky Dragon 50 system is formed by one command centre vehicle, one IBIS130 search radar vehicle and up to 6 launch vehicles, each carrying 4 missiles. A new code name GAS2 was also published in promotion materials.

Deployment
The Sky Dragon 50 SAM system was designed to be a competitor to the HQ-16 (LY-80). However it has not been adopted by the People's Liberation Army for service as the HQ-16 has been preferred. Instead, it has been exported for use by foreign armed forces.

In 2014, it was reported that the Rwandan Armed Forces has purchased at least 4 launchers of the Sky Dragon 50.

In 2017, the Sky Dragon 50 was sold to the Moroccan Armed Forces. Prior to taking delivery, Moroccan officers from the Royal Artillery, radar specialist, and air defense operator units had undergone training in China.

Operators

Current operators
 
Royal Moroccan Army - 24 launchers

Rwanda Defence Force - 4 launchers

References

 19960619, National Air Intelligence Center (NAIC):  "Lieh Ying: The Chinese-built Surface to Air Missile Weapon System", An Hua, NAIC-ID(RS)T-0253-96

See also
List of surface-to-air missiles

Surface-to-air missiles of the People's Republic of China
Guided missiles of the People's Republic of China
Military equipment introduced in the 2010s

ru:PL-11